Alpha Muscae, Latinized from α Muscae, is a star in the southern circumpolar constellation of Musca. With an apparent visual magnitude of +2.7, it is the brightest star in the constellation.

With a stellar classification of B2 IV-V, this star appears to be in the process of evolving away from the main sequence of stars like the Sun and turning a subgiant star, as the supply of hydrogen at its core becomes exhausted. It is larger than the Sun, with nearly nine times the mass and almost five times the radius. This star is radiating around 4,000 times as much luminosity as the Sun from its outer atmosphere at an effective temperature of 21,400 K, giving it the blue-white hue of a B-type star.

Alpha Muscae appears to be a Beta Cephei variable star. Telting and colleagues report it as a Beta Cephei with a high degree of confidence as they found regular pulsations in its spectrum in a high-resolution spectroscopy study published in 2006, although Stankov and Handler (2005) listed it as a poor or rejected candidate in their Catalog of Galactic β Cephei Stars. The International Variable Star Index lists it as a Beta Cephei variable which varies in brightness from magnitude 2.68 to 2.73, with a period of 2.17 hours.

This star is a proper motion member of the Lower Centaurus–Crux sub-group in the Scorpius–Centaurus OB association, the nearest such association of co-moving massive stars to the Sun. Alpha Muscae has a peculiar velocity of 10 km s−1, which, while high, is not enough for it to be considered a runaway star.

References 

B-type main-sequence stars
B-type subgiants
Beta Cephei variables
Lower Centaurus Crux

Musca (constellation)
Muscae, Alpha
CD-68 01104
109668
061585
4798